George Reinhardt was an American politician from Milwaukee, Wisconsin who spent one term as a Republican member of the Wisconsin State Assembly.

References 

Politicians from Milwaukee
Year of birth missing
Year of death missing
Republican Party members of the Wisconsin State Assembly